Paul Cantabene (born March 26, 1970 in Rochester, New York) is a retired professional lacrosse player and face-off specialist. He is the namesake for the Premier Lacrosse League's Paul Cantabene Faceoff Athlete of the Year Award, being described as one of the most intense and hardest working players and having revolutionized the faceoff position.

Playing career
Cantabene attended Irondequoit High School then Loyola College in Maryland, where he was an All-American lacrosse player.

Professional career
In 1994, he made his professional lacrosse debut in the Major Indoor Lacrosse League with the Baltimore Thunder.  He followed the franchise on its relocation to Pittsburgh and back to Washington.  He then played out the rest of his indoor lacrosse career, until 2004, with the Philadelphia Wings.

Cantabene joined the Baltimore Bayhawks in the inaugural season of the Major League Lacrosse.  He remained with the team though 2005, helping the Bayhawks capture the Steinfeld Cup in both 2002 and 2005.  In 2002, he was given the Major League Lacrosse Iron Lizard of the Year Award the player who "most embodied the traits of toughness, tenacity and determination regardless of pain or injury during season."  In 2006, he was traded to the Philadelphia Barrage where he captured his third Steinfeld Cup victory.  He retired from the Major League Lacrosse after the season.

Professional Lacrosse Hall of Fame
On June 18, 2022, Cantabene was inducted into the Professional Lacrosse Hall of Fame as one of the eleven members of the inaugural class of inductees.

Statistics

NLL

MLL

Coaching

A long-time assistant coach at the Division I level, Cantabene spent nine combined seasons at Maryland, Towson and Johns Hopkins before settling down at Stevenson University. Currently, Cantabene is an Associate Athletic Director and Head Lacrosse Coach at Stevenson University, formerly Villa Julie College.

High school
Cantabene began his coaching career in Owings Mills at The McDonogh School where he spent two seasons as the offensive coordinator in 1994 and 1995, highlighted by a victory over Gilman, the No. 1-ranked team in the MIAA in 1995.

Johns Hopkins University
Cantabene served as the midfield coach at Johns Hopkins where he helped the Blue Jays to a 41-15 record and three consecutive berths in the NCAA Division I Men's Lacrosse Championship, including a semifinal appearance in 1998. He worked with six All-Americans in three seasons, including three-time honorees A.J. Haugen and Brian Carcaterra.

Towson University
Cantabene was part of the Tigers' revival, which saw them reach the 2001 NCAA semifinals before losing to eventual national champion Princeton. Towson finished with a 14-4 record and the highest scoring offense in the nation. While at Towson, Cantabene coached five All-Americans, including Spencer Ford who was a 1999 honorable mention selection after leading the nation in assists per game and ranking second in points per game. Kevin Sturm also led the nation in goals per game.

University of Maryland
During his two seasons at College Park in 2003 and 2004, he served as an assistant under Dave Cottle for whom he played for at Loyola. In 2003, Cantabene helped the Terps' offense to one of their most successful seasons en route to a 12-4 record and an appearance in the NCAA semifinals. Maryland ranked ninth in Division I in scoring offense and three of Cantabene's players, Mike Mollot, Ryan Moran and Joe Walters were named All-Americans. Walters was also the 2003 ACC Rookie of the Year.

FIL World U.S. men's lacrosse team
In 2010, Catabene was one of four assistant coaches for the U.S. men's lacrosse team that captured the 2010 world title with a 12-10 victory over rival Canada in the FIL World Championship gold medal game.

Stevenson University
Cantabene is Stevenson's winningest coach in both wins and percentage, picking up his 100th career win on March 3, 2012, becoming the second-fastest in Division III to reach the career mark. In their last nine seasons, the Mustangs have appeared in eight conference championship games, winning twice 2010 & 2013, made five appearances in the NCAA Division III Men's Lacrosse Playoffs, including four semifinals appearances and one championship game!

Over those six seasons, Stevenson has had a 60-9 home record, as well as 20 All-CAC and 32 All-America selections. In 2011 and 2012 the team boasted a program record nine All-Americans. Stevenson has also ranked in the top 20 nationally the last seven consecutive seasons, finishing at No. 1 in 2009 and 2010.

In 2009, Cantabene was named College Coach of the Year by the Maryland State Lacrosse Coaches Association after leading the Mustangs to a 17-2 record, its first-ever NCAA appearance and a No. 1 ranking in the final USILA Division III poll. They also won a school-record 14 consecutive games and went 7-2 against teams in the top 20 with wins over Gettysburg, Lynchburg, Salisbury, Denison and Cabrini.

Year 	Overall 	Pct. 	Conference 	Pct. 	Finish 	Notes
2005 	9-6 	.600 	4-2 	.667 	2nd
2006 	10-8 	.556 	6-1 	.857 	2nd 	ECAC Metro/South champions
2007 	11-5 	.688 	7-1 	.875 	2nd 	 
2008 	13-4 	.765 	6-1 	.857 	2nd 	 
2009 	17-2 	.895 	7-0 	1.000 	1st 	NCAA semifinals
2010 	19-2 	.905 	6-1 	.857 	2nd 	CAC champions; NCAA semifinals
2011 	18-3 	.857 	8-0 	1.000 	1st 	NCAA quarterfinals
2012 	18-5 	.783 	7-1 	.875 	2nd 	NCAA semifinals
2013 	22-2 	.913 	8-0 	1.000 	1st 	CC champions; NCAA champions
2014 	19-3 	.900 	8-0 	1.000 	1st 	CC champions; NCAA quarterfinals
2015 	16-5 	.762 	8-0 	1.000 	1st 	CC champions; NCAA second round
2016 	15-5 	.750 	8.0 	1.000 	1st 	CC champions; NCAA first round
2017 	14-6 	.700 	8-0 	1.000 	1st 	CC champions, NCAA third round
2018    12-7    .640    8-0     1.000   1st     CC champions: NCAA second round
2019    13-8    .650    8-0     1.000   1st     CC champions: NCAA third round
Totals 	226-69 	.766 	107-7 	.938            11 NCAA Tournaments 9 CC champions

References

External links
Maryland Men's Lacrosse Profile
Stevenson University Men's Lacrosse Profile

Living people
1970 births
American lacrosse players
Major League Lacrosse players
Philadelphia Wings players
Stevenson University
Major League Lacrosse major award winners
Loyola Greyhounds men's lacrosse players
Sportspeople from Rochester, New York